Kieran Hodgson is a British character comedian, actor, and writer. He is best known for his role as Gordon in Two Doors Down.

Early life and education
Kieran Hodgson was raised in Holmfirth, West Yorkshire and educated at Greenhead College in Huddersfield. He studied History and French at Balliol College, Oxford, graduating with a first-class degree.

Career
Hodgson's first solo show at the Edinburgh Festival Fringe was French Exchange, which was nominated by The Times as one of the "Top five of the Free Fringe 2014". It retold the story of a GCSE French exchange trip in a comedy storytelling style.  That year, he also appeared as an aspiring detective called Ridley in an episode of Jonathan Creek, entitled "The Letters of Septimus Noone".

In 2015, his show Lance, a similarly biographical storytelling piece about his childhood hero, Lance Armstrong,
 was nominated for the Edinburgh Comedy Award. Hodgson appeared in an episode of the third series of Drifters. He received the nomination again in 2016 for his show Maestro, which used his interest in classical music and attempt to write a symphony as a metaphor for his life. In 2018, Hodgson launched a new show, 75, at the Fringe. It used the 1975 referendum on Europe as a means of exploring the contemporary Brexit debate, with Hodgson impersonating many famous UK politicians from the 1970s. He was nominated for the Comedy Award for a third time, before taking the show on the road from January 2019. This formed the basis for his Channel 4 comedy documentary How Europe Stole My Mum.

Hodgson appeared as Ian Lavender in the one-off BBC Two drama We're Doomed! The Dad's Army Story. Hodgson also starred in The Lentil Sorters on BBC Radio 4, presented Kieran Hodgson's Earworms for Radio 4 in August 2017, and made appearances in Siblings on BBC Three, Count Arthur Strong on BBC Two and the film Alan Partridge: Alpha Papa. 

In 2017  Hodgson first appeared as Gordon, the new boyfriend of Ian, in the BBC Scotland television comedy series Two Doors Down, a role that he reprised in the 2019 series.

In 2022 he appeared as Prince Andrew in the Channel 4 programme Prince Andrew: The Musical; he also co-wrote the music and lyrics.

Personal life
Hodgson is a keen musician. He is a fan of romantic music, in particular the music of Gustav Mahler, and this was the topic of his stand-up show Maestro. Hodgson learned both the violin and piano as a child. He played in the North London Sinfonia for eight years, from 2012 to 2020.

References

External links 
 

British male television actors
Year of birth missing (living people)
Living people
Place of birth missing (living people)
British comedians
Date of birth missing (living people)
British LGBT comedians
Alumni of Balliol College, Oxford